Nils Vogt may refer to:

Nils Vogt (comedian) (born 1948), Norwegian comedian
Nils Vogt (civil servant) (1926–2000), Norwegian civil servant and diplomat
Nils Collett Vogt (1864–1937), Norwegian poet
Nils Vogt (journalist) (1859–1927), Norwegian journalist and editor

See also
Niels Petersen Vogt (1817–1894), Norwegian politician
Niels Nielsen Vogt (1798–1869), Norwegian priest and politician